is a former Japanese football player.

Career
Howbert was born to a Japanese mother and a Liberian father. He opted to choose Japanese citizenship in 2009.

References

External links

Kyoto Sanga FC Profile

1987 births
Living people
Aichi Gakuin University alumni
Association football people from Kanagawa Prefecture
Japanese footballers
J1 League players
J2 League players
Japan Football League players
Kyoto Sanga FC players
YSCC Yokohama players
Association football forwards
Japanese people of Liberian descent
Sportspeople of Liberian descent